Playmatic was a Spanish manufacturer of pinball machines, producing approx. 63 different models between 1968 and 1987. Although American pinball manufacturers create playfields by directly painting the artwork on a wooden surface, then add a layer of varnish or clear coat, Playmatic and other European manufacturers included the artwork on a durable plastic sheet laid over the flat wooden surface, resulting in added durability of the artwork image.

List of Playmatic Pinball Machines
Antar 1979
Apache 1975
Attack 1980
Big Town 1978 (First Playmatic Solid State machine released April '78)
Black Fever 1980
Black Flag 1975
Caddie 1975
Caravan 1967
Carnival 1977
Cerberus 1982
Chance 1974
Chance 1978
Clown 1968
Conquest 200 1976
Dixie 1980
Ducks 1975
Evil Fight 1980
Fairy 1975
Fandango 1976
Fantasy 1976
Fiesta 1976 (4 Player version of Fiesta)
Flash Dragon 1986
Geisha 1973 (1 & 2 Player versions of this were produced)
Gunner 1974
Hangers 1977
Harem 1974 (4 Player)
Hit Line 1969
Joker 1974 (1 & 2 Player versions of this were produced)
Jolly Ride 1974 (1, 2 & 4 Player versions of this were produced)
KZ-26 1984
Last Lap 1978
Mad Race 1985
Magic 1973
Meg Aaton 1984
Nautilus 1984
New World 1976
Party 1979
Phantom Ship 1987
Play Time 1973
Poker 1969
Racers 1968
Rio 1977 (Last electro mechanical game)
Robin Hood 1969
Robin Hood 1971
Rock 2500 1985
Serenade 1969
Skill Flight 1987
Space Gambler 1978
Spain 82 1982
Speakeasy 1972
Star Fire 1985
Stop Ship 1985
Super Win 1980
Tam-Tam 1975
The 30s 1977
The Raid 1984
Trailer 1985
UFO-X 1984
Viking 1970
Zira 1980

References

See also
 Zaccaria (company), a former Italian company of pinball and arcade machines
 Taito of Brazil, a former Brazilian company of pinball and arcade machines
 Inder, a former Spanish company of pinball and arcade machines
 Maresa, a former Spanish company of pinball machines

Entertainment companies of Spain
Defunct manufacturing companies of Spain
Pinball manufacturers